SkyMed is a Canadian television medical drama series, which premiered on July 10, 2022 on CBC Television. The series centres on the nurses and pilots working for an air ambulance service in remote northern Manitoba. The series has been renewed for a second season.

Cast and characters

Main
 Natasha Calis as Nurse Hayley Roberts, a delivery nurse leaving a secret behind in Toronto
 Morgan Holmstrom as Crystal Highway, a Cree/Métis "mama bear" caretaker with a tough-as-nails attitude who is the soul of SkyMed.
 Praneet Akilla as Jay Chopper, a pilot and engineer who aspires to be an astronaut and faces challenges in his personal relationships.
 Aason Nadjiwan as Captain Austen Bodie, a hotshot pilot romantically involved with Hayley
 Mercedes Morris as Lexi Martine, an up-and-coming pilot who is often forced to choose between her convictions and her ambitions.
 Thomas Elms as Captain Milosz Nowak, a pilot and bartender whose tough-love attitude wins him many colleagues but few friends.
 Kheon Clarke as Tristan Green, an empathic, well-liked flight nurse.
 Rebecca Kwan as Emma Lin, an upbeat and professional ground nurse at North House First Nation, Crystal and Jeremy’s home community.
 Braeden Clarke as Jeremy Wood, Crystal’s ex, North House's resident fixer and smuggler.
 Emilia McCarthy as Madison Van Camp, a local waitress and bartender involved with Bodie.
 Patrick Kwok-Choon as Dr. Trevor Sung, an ER physician at the local hospital who is interested in Crystal both personally and professionally.
 Jeff Teravainen as Pierce, SkyMed's commanding officer.
 Aaron Ashmore as Captain William "Wheezer" Heaseman. A experienced pilot, who prefers cargo flights over medivac fights. He is the den dad of the pilots and nurses, dispensing advice and grilled meat in equal measure.

Recurring
 Ryan Ali as Reese
 Matthew Kevin Anderson as Brad, a loading hand and pilot hopeful with questionable morals.
 Ryan DeLong as Steve
 Gino Anania as Devon, Emma’s often too-serious fiancée.
 Sharon Bajer as Denise, Bodie's mom
 Laura Olafson as Darla
 Karl Thordarson as Frank

Production and development
The show was developed by Julie Puckrin, who drew inspiration from her nurse sister and pilot brother-in-law who worked aboard air ambulances. To help with the stories the writing staff included both Indigenous and queer writers.

The initial season was shot from late August 2021 until mid-January 2022 in Winnipeg and northern Manitoba. A lot of the effects on the show were done on a practical basis rather than using green-screen technology.

Episodes

On-demand
The complete first season was released on-demand in the United States by Paramount+ on July 10, 2022 and in New Zealand by TVNZ+ on August 5, 2022.

References

External links

2022 Canadian television series debuts
2020s Canadian drama television series
2020s Canadian medical television series
CBC Television original programming
English-language television shows
Television series by CBS Studios
Television shows set in Manitoba